Marie Wahlgren (born 1962) is a Swedish academic and Liberal People's Party politician.

Career
Wahlgren was a member of the Riksdag from 2002 until 2006.

 She has published a number of  journal articles on food technology.

Selected bibliography

Journal articles

References

External links
Marie Wahlgren at the Riksdag website

Members of the Riksdag from the Liberals (Sweden)
Members of the Riksdag 2002–2006
Living people
1962 births
Women members of the Riksdag
21st-century Swedish women politicians